Lick Branch is a stream in Montgomery County in the U.S. state of Missouri. It is a tributary of McIntosh Branch.

Lick Branch was so named on account of a mineral lick near its course which attracted buffalo.

See also
List of rivers of Missouri

References

Rivers of Montgomery County, Missouri
Rivers of Missouri